2013 in Ghana details events of note that has been predicted to happen in the Ghana in the year 2013.

Incumbents
 President: John Dramani Mahama
 Vice President: Kwesi Amissah-Arthur
 Chief Justice: Georgina Wood
 Speaker of Parliament: Joyce Bamford-Addo (until January 6); Edward Doe Adjaho (after January 6)

Events

January
 January 24 - The first Data Innovation Day, a day designed to raise awareness on how increased use of information can benefit individuals from the public and private sector, takes place.
 January 29 - President Mahama orders an investigation of a seizure of $80 million in gold at a Turkish airport. The gold was meant to be transported to Iran.

February

 February 4 - President Mahama defends his Minister of State, saying that he is still able to perform his duties despite his visual impairment.
 February 12 - Law lecturer Moses Foh-Amoaning promises that he will reform gay advocate Andrew Solomon, through Christian prayers and cogent arguments.

March
March 4, Rlg Communications cut sword for the construction of Hope City.
March 6, 56th Interdependence Day Anniversary

April

May

June

July

August
 August 29, Election petition verdict.

September
September 21:Founder's Day (Ghana)

October

November

National holidays
Holidays in italics are "special days", while those in regular type are "regular holidays".
 January 1: New Year's Day
 March 6: Independence Day
 April 22 Good Friday
 May 1: Labor Day
 September 21:Founder's Day
 December 25: Christmas
 December 26: Boxing day

In addition, several other places observe local holidays, such as the foundation of their town. These are also "special days."

References